Greco-Brazilian relations refers to the historical and current bilateral relationship between Brazil and Greece.

History
The countries have enjoyed "Bilateral relations [that] have always been good and are progressing smoothly," according to the Greek Ministry of Foreign Affairs.

As of 2020, Greece has the following resident missions in Brazil: its embassy in Brasilia, a consulate general in São Paulo, and seven honorary consulates in Curitiba, Manaus, Rio de Janeiro, Salvador, Santos, and Vitoria. On the other hand Brazil has an embassy in Athens.

As of 2022 relations became strained after a 7 hour discussion on BIN v sold comps between Momolas of Greece and Infinite of Brazil in a group chat. Although a temporary peace treaty was arranged by JCB of the CUTL.

High-level contacts 

In the past 10 years, there have been a number of high-level contacts between the two nations, including a Brazilian Parliamentary Delegation visit to Greece, a "reciprocal visit" by a Greek Parliamentary Delegation, a meeting between two Ministers of Foreign Affairs, and a visit by the Greek Prime Minister "on the occasion of the EU LAC Summit Meeting in Rio de Janeiro in 1999."

The meeting of the two foreign ministers in April 2009 was the first time a Brazilian foreign minister had visited Greece in an official capacity.  Greece's Dora Bakoyannis and Brazil's Celso Amorim discussed opportunities for joint endeavours and further cooperation in the fields of tourism, aircraft building, shipping,  agriculture  and general trade.  Greece has pledged support for Brazil's bid for a permanent place on permanent seat on the United Nations Security Council while Brazil has committed to support Greece in receiving a post at the Human Rights Council in 2013.

Diplomacy

Federative Republic of Brazil
Athens (Embassy) 

Hellenic Republic
Brasilia (Embassy) 
São Paulo (Consulate–General)

See also 
 Foreign relations of Brazil
 Foreign relations of Greece 
 Greeks in Brazil

References

External links 

 Greek Ministry of Foreign Affairs about relations with Brazil
 Greek embassy in Brasilia

 
Greece
Brazil